Nepal Rashtrabadi Gorkha Parishad (Nepal Nationalist Gorkha Council), a pro-monarchy political party in Nepal. The party was founded in 1951 by members of the erstwhile Rana dynasty. The party was led by Bharat Shamsher JBR and MG Mrigendra Shamsher JBR.

In 1990, a group reorganized a party under the same name.

History 
The party was known as Gorkha Dal until 1952, when it was suppressed after an armed mob had attacked the residence of B.P. Koirala. According to Levi, the party was a far-right communal creation of the Ranas.

The party won 19 seats in the 1959 general elections and was the largest opposition in the House of Representatives.

Shamsher was arrested in the 1960 royal coup, but was released in the fall of 1961 after giving support to the King. He was able to travel abroad, visited the Rome session of the Socialist International and then went to India. In India he denounced the royal regime in Nepal and pledged cooperation with the Nepali Congress to overthrow it. A month later he announced the merger of the party with the Nepali Congress. The Gorkha Parishad leaders in Kathmandu did however condemn this action. The party later disappeared, and its leaders went either to the opposition Nepali Congress or to work in the Panchayat system.

Electoral performance

References 

Nepalese Hindu political parties
Political parties established in 1951
1951 establishments in Nepal
Defunct political parties in Nepal
Monarchist parties in Nepal